Binələr (also, Binelyar) is a village and municipality in the Agdash Rayon of Azerbaijan.  It has a population of 786.

References 

Populated places in Agdash District